Egg hunt is a game of collecting hidden eggs. The term may also refer to:

The Egg Hunt (1940 film), a Columbia Color Rhapsody animation voiced by Mel Blanc
"Egg Hunt", an episode of Dora the Explorer TV series.
The Egg Hunt (album) 
Egg Hunt (band)